Vichy is a town in Auvergne, France.

Vichy may also refer to:
 Vichy France, the French regime in metropolitan France collaborating with the Nazis during World War II
 Vichy, Missouri, a town in the United States
 Vichy shower, a kind of shower used at spas

Drinks and food 
 Vichy water, carbonated mineral water
 Vichy Pastilles, a brand of mint sweet (candy)
 Vichyssoise, a soup

Other 
 , woven pattern in cloth, cf in English language : Gingham

See also
Vici (disambiguation)
Vicci
Vigy, a commune in Moselle, France